Anthony Günther, Count of Oldenburg (aka Anton Günther, 10 November 158319 June 1667) was an Imperial Count and a member of the House of Oldenburg

Günther was born in Oldenburg and was the ruling count of Oldenburg from 1603 until his death in Rastede, and of Delmenhorst from 1647 until his death. He was the son of John VII (1540–1603) and Elisabeth of Schwarzburg-Blankenburg.

Anthony Günther married Sophie Catherine (28 June 1617 – 22 November 1696), a daughter of Alexander, Duke of Schleswig-Holstein-Sonderburg and Dorothea of Schwarzburg-Sondershausen.

Biography
S. Baring-Gould relates the following interesting anecdote about the count in his book "Strange Survivals Some Chapters in the History of Man":

In 1615 Count Anthony Günther of Oldenburg, on visiting a dyke in process of construction, found the workmen about to bury an infant under it. The count interfered, saved the child, reprimanded the dam-builders, and imprisoned the mother who had sold her babe for the purpose. Singularly enough, this same count is declared by tradition to have buried a living child in the foundations of his castle at Oldenburg.

Haus "Graf Anton Günther"
The Haus "Graf Anton Günther" is a historic house in central Oldenburg, dating from 1682. Count Anton Günther is depicted on the facade, which was redesigned in the neo-Renaissance style in 1894. The house was used by merchants and tobacco manufacturers.

References

Sources
 Friedrich-Wilhelm Schaer: Anton Günther, in: Hans Friedl, Wolfgang Günther, Hilke Günther-Arndt and Heinrich Schmidt (eds.): Biographisches Handbuch zur Geschichte des Landes Oldenburg, Isensee Verlag, Oldenburg, 1992, pp. 37–40
 Karl Veit Riedel: August Oetken, in: Biographisches Handbuch zur Geschichte des Landes Oldenburg, Isensee Verlag, Oldenburg, 1992, pp. 534–535
 Gerold Schmidt: Der Kirchenmaler und Mosaikkünstler des Historismus Prof. August Oetken (1868–1951), Mitgestalter des Melanchthonhauses in Bretten, in: Stefan Rhein and Gerhard Schwinge (eds.): Das Melanchthonhaus Bretten. Ein Beispiel des Reformationsgedenkens der Jahrhundertwende, Verlag Regionalkultur, Ubstadt-Weiher, 1997, pp. 167–212

External links

 
 
 Page at kulturportalnordwest.de

1583 births
1667 deaths
17th-century German people
Counts of Oldenburg
German people of the Thirty Years' War